A Gamblin' Fool is a 1920 American short silent Western film released by Universal Film Mfg. Co. (later to become Universal Pictures), written by Ford Beebe, directed by Leo D. Maloney and featuring Hoot Gibson.

Cast
 Hoot Gibson
 Dorothy Wood
 Jim Corey
 Harry Jackson
 Chick Morrison

See also
 Hoot Gibson filmography

External links
 

1920 films
1920 short films
American silent short films
1920 Western (genre) films
American black-and-white films
Films directed by Leo D. Maloney
Silent American Western (genre) films
1920s American films
1920s English-language films